Height is the measurement of vertical distance.

Height may also refer to:

Mathematics and computer science
 Height (abelian group), an invariant that captures the divisibility properties of an element
 Height (ring theory), a measurement in commutative algebra
 Height (triangle) or altitude
 Height function, a function that quantifies the complexity of mathematical objects
 Height of a field, exponent of torsion in the Witt group
 Height, the logarithm of the first nonzero term in the formal power series
 Tree height, length of the longest root-to-leaf path in a tree data structure

Music
 Height (musician), Baltimore hip hop artist
 Height (album), an album by John Nolan

People
 Amy Height (c. 1866–1913), African-American music hall entertainer in the UK
 Bob Height, 19th century African-American blackface minstrel performer
 Dorothy Height (1912–2010), civil rights activist

See also

 The Heights (disambiguation), including "Heights"
 
 Human height
 Tree height measurement
 Reduced height of a field, the Pythagoras number